Paths in Twilight is a 1948 West German drama film directed by and starring Gustav Fröhlich. It also features Sonja Ziemann and Benno Sterzenbach. It is part of the rubble film tradition made in Germany in the wake of the Second World War.

It was shot at the Bendestorf Studios outside Hamburg and on location in Hannover. The film's sets were designed by the art director Erich Grave.

Synopsis
The film portrays the lives of three youths in immediate post-war Hannover who are homeless and try to make a living on the black market. When they are falsely connected with a murder they flee the city to the countryside where a sympathetic mayor offers them a fresh start.

Cast
 Gustav Fröhlich as Otto Lukas
 Johanna Lepski  as Edith Siems
 Sonja Ziemann as Lissy Stenzel
 Benno Sterzenbach as Stefan Kolb
 Gerd E. Schäfer as Peter Wille
 Alfred Laufhütte as Sepp Lauterjung
 Axel Scholtz as Erwin Putzke
 Hubert Endlein
 Peter A. Horn
 Hanns Lothar
 Wolfgang Völz as Junger Ganove

References

Bibliography 
 Bock, Hans-Michael & Bergfelder, Tim. The Concise Cinegraph: Encyclopaedia of German Cinema. Berghahn Books, 2009.

External links 
 

1948 films
German drama films
1948 drama films
West German films
1940s German-language films
Films directed by Gustav Fröhlich
German black-and-white films
1940s German films